Geert Boekhout (born 12 April 1958) is a Belgian former freestyle swimmer. She competed in two events at the 1976 Summer Olympics.

References

External links
 

1958 births
Living people
Belgian female freestyle swimmers
Olympic swimmers of Belgium
Swimmers at the 1976 Summer Olympics
Place of birth missing (living people)